Choroda is a rural locality (a selo) and the administrative center of Chorodinsky Selsoviet, Tlyaratinsky District, Republic of Dagestan, Russia. The population was 478 as of 2010. There are 2 streets.

Geography 
Choroda is located 29 km southeast of Tlyarata (the district's administrative centre) by road. Salda is the nearest rural locality.

References 

Rural localities in Tlyaratinsky District